The Kaiserquartett (Hob. III:77, Op. 76, No.3), English: Emperor Quartet), is a string quartet in C major by Joseph Haydn.

The Kaiserquartett is the third of the six String Quartets, Op. 76, which Haydn composed in 1797 at the age of 65 after his return from London and dedicated to Count Erdődy. They were published in 1799. It was nicknamed the "Kaiserquartett" because its second movement contains four cantus firmus variations on the theme of the "Volkslied" previously composed by Haydn (according to the first edition of 1797) "Gott erhalte Franz den Kaiser", written for Francis II.

Some 40 years later, August Heinrich Hoffmann von Fallersleben wrote his "Deutschlandlied" on the then British island Heligoland to Haydn's, an Austrian, famous and popular melody, the third verse of which today is the text of the national anthem of Germany.

Movements

References

External links
 
 

String quartets by Joseph Haydn
1797 compositions
Music dedicated to nobility or royalty
Compositions in C major